Balyktyul (Balıktu Ĵul) is a rural locality (a selo) and the administrative centre of Balyktyulskoye Rural Settlement of Ulagansky District, the Altai Republic, Russia. The population was 1340 as of 2016. There are 24 streets.

Geography 
Balyktyul is located 16 km northeast of Ulagan (the district's administrative centre) by road. Ulagan is the nearest rural locality.

References 

Rural localities in Ulagansky District